is a Japanese retired actor.

Career
Otaka was born in Kanagawa, Japan. At age six he was chosen to play the part of seven-year-old Yoichi Asakawa in Ring. Today, he (alongside Hiroyuki Sanada who played Ryuji Takayama in Ring) is the most credited and popular male character in the Ring series. He reprised his role as Yoichi a year after the first sequel Rasen was a failure in the cinemas. In Ring 2, his character was the supporting male actor.

At 9 he worked as an extra and made a notable appearance in the film adaptation of the hit TV series Kamen Rider Agito. He then rejoined Hideo Nakata to play Yuuchi in Sleeping Bride. He made small appearances in Chloe and The Sea Is Watching.

He then starred as the main player in Baseball Kids. He then starred in a drama movie Catharsis as Subaru.

He more recently starred with Ken Watanabe in the drama history film Kita no Zeronen playing the Mamiya's son.

Filmography

TV series
Dear Woman (TBS, 1996) - Junpei Tsuno
Beach Boys (Fuji TV, 1997, Ep.9) - Haruki Yoshinaga
Ai to Kandō no Jitsuwa: Sayonara Mōdōken Berna (Fuji TV, 1998) - Kanta
Aoi (NHK, 2000) - Young Toyotomi Hideyori
Nagoya Senkyaku Banrai (NHK, 2000) - Hiroshi Yoshida
Black Jack 2: Tensai Joi no Wedding Dress (TBS, 2000) - Takashi Machiyama
Musashi (NHK, 2003) - Young Sasaki Kojirō
Kunimitsu no Matsuri (Fuji TV, 2003) - Fujio Egashira
Uchi wa Step Family (TBS, 2005) - Shō Takano

Films
Ring (1998) - Yoichi Asakawa
Ring 2 (1999) - Yoichi Asakawa
Sleeping Bride (2000) - Young Yūichi Nagasawa
Chloe (2001) - Boy
Kamen Rider Agito the Movie: Project G4 (2001) - Rei Motoki
Tasogare Ryūseigun: Dōsōkai Seidan (2002) - Akira
The Sea Is Watching (2002)
Baseball Kids (2003) - Tsubasa Machida
Life is Journey (2003)
Catharsis (2003) - Subaru
The Boat to Heaven (2003) - Young Haruto Ishida
Kita no Zeronen (2005) - Yūnosuke Mamiya
Mabataki (2006) - Yukio

External links
 

1991 births
21st-century Japanese male actors
Japanese male child actors
Living people